2011 in television may refer to
 2011 in American television for television related events in the United States.
 2011 in Australian television for television related events in Australia.
 2011 in Belgian television for television related events in Belgium.
 2011 in Brazilian television for television related events in Brazil.
 2011 in British television for television related events in Great Britain.
 2011 in Scottish television for television related events in Scotland.
 2011 in Canadian television for television related events in Canada.
 2011 in Croatian television for television related events in Croatia.
 2011 in Danish television for television related events in Denmark.
 2011 in Dutch television for television related events in the Netherlands.
 2011 in Estonian television for television related events in Estonia.
 2011 in French television for television related events in France.
 2011 in German television for television related events in Germany.
 2011 in Irish television for television related events in Ireland.
 2011 in Italian television for television related events in Italy.
 2011 in Japanese television for television related events in Japan.
 2011 in Mexican television for television related events in Mexico.
 2011 in New Zealand television for television related events in New Zealand.
 2011 in Norwegian television for television related events in Norway.
 2011 in Pakistani television for television related events in Pakistan.
 2011 in Philippine television for television related events in the Philippines.
 2011 in Polish television for television related events in Poland.
 2011 in Portuguese television for television related events in Portugal.
 2011 in South African television for television related events in South Africa.
 2011 in Spanish television for television related events in Spain.
 2011 in Swedish television for television related events in Sweden.
 2011 in Turkish television for television related events in Turkey.

 
Mass media timelines by year